is Sachi Tainaka's fifth single and was released on June 6, 2007. The title track was used as the ending theme for the Japanese animation Moribito: Guardian of the Spirit.

The single reached #67 in Japan. The CD's catalog number is GNCX-0009.

Track listing

"Itoshii Hito e"
"Begin"
"Itoshii Hito e" (Instrumental)
"Begin" (Instrumental)

References

2007 singles
Sachi Tainaka songs
2007 songs